Weezer (also known as the Black Album) is the thirteenth studio album by the American rock band Weezer. Produced by Dave Sitek, it was released on March 1, 2019, through Crush Music and Atlantic Records, nearly two months after Weezer (Teal Album).

Background
Weezer frontman Rivers Cuomo first hinted at the album in April 2016, shortly after the band released their tenth album Weezer (The White Album). "What could stand out more against 'White' than 'Black'? I think it's going to maybe be like Beach Boys gone bad. I'm thinking of swearing, which is something I've never done in songs."

While promoting the band's eleventh album Pacific Daydream in August 2017, Cuomo said "The original plan was the Black Album but Pacific Daydream really came together. The Black Album is pretty much ready, it's coming."

Release
Cuomo first told Australian radio station Double J in February 2018 that the album would be released on May 25, later hinting at dates such as June 1 and June 12 on his Twitter account. On October 11, the first single from the album, "Can't Knock the Hustle", was released. A second song, "Zombie Bastards", was released on November 21, along with cover art and a release date for the album, set as March 1, 2019. Two more singles followed on February 21, 2019, which are "High as a Kite" and "Living in L.A.". Additionally, "California Snow" was released as a single for the soundtrack of the 2018 film Spell. On the day before release, three songs from the album premiered on the video game Fortnite.

Critical reception

At the aggregating website Metacritic, the album has received a normalized rating of 53, based on 19 critical reviews, indicating "mixed or average" reviews.

Robert Oliver at Drowned in Sound gave the album a favorable review, stating "This is a unique addition to Weezer’s discography that sees them preparing for the future, however bleak and overwhelming it might seem." Aaron Mook of Chorus.fm also reacted positively, writing "The Black Album feels surprisingly genuine for the aging pop-rockers, brimming with new sounds, bold production choices from TV on the Radio’s Dave Sitek, and most importantly, honest reflection on how the world has turned and left the band following their return to relevancy."

However, Linday Teske from Consequence of Sound noted that the album is "not completely void of redeeming qualities", but also opined that "While it is absolutely no crime for a band to flirt with sonic experimentation, a disastrous affair can brew when the flirtation results in a body of work that is far more two-dimensional and hollow than what the band have proven capable of doing through their decades of previous work." Additionally, a negative review from [[Exclaim!|''Exclaim!s]] Corey van den Hoogenband, stated that "Weezer's latest is an utterly skippable collection that'd be entirely unremarkable if not for the fact it was released by Weezer."

Track listing

PersonnelWeezer Rivers Cuomo – lead vocals, lead guitar, keyboards
 Patrick Wilson – drums
 Scott Shriner – bass guitar, backing vocals, keyboards
 Brian Bell – rhythm guitar, backing vocals, keyboardsAdditional musicians Money Mark – keyboards 
 Sam Robles – horns 
 Todd Simon – horns Production'''
 David Andrew Sitek – producer, engineer
 Kool Kojak – additional production 
 Jonny Coffer – co-producer 
 Jerome Williams – additional production 
 Liza Boldyreva – assistant engineer
 Matty Green – mixing
 Eric Boulanger – mastering
 Michael Beinhorn – pre/post production
 Jason Hiller – additional guitar engineering

Charts

References

2019 albums
Albums produced by Dave Sitek
Weezer albums
Atlantic Records albums
Crush Management albums
Electropop albums
Dance music albums by American artists